The 1969 Tour du Haut Var was the inaugural edition of the Tour du Haut Var cycle race and was held on 3 March 1969. The race started in Nice and finished in Seillans. The race was won by Raymond Poulidor.

General classification

References

1969
1969 in road cycling
1969 in French sport